Poličnik is a municipality within Zadar County in Croatia. According to the 2011 census, there are 4,669 inhabitants, a majority of which are Croats.

Municipalities of Croatia
Populated places in Zadar County